John Elias Bass (July 22, 1848 – September 25, 1888) was an American professional baseball player who played shortstop in the major leagues from -. He played for the Cleveland Forest Citys, Brooklyn Atlantics, and Hartford Dark Blues.

In 1871, he led the National Association in triples with ten.

Bass served in Company F of the 1st New York Cavalry Regiment during the American Civil War. He is buried in Riverside Cemetery in Denver, Colorado.

References

External links

1848 births
1888 deaths
Major League Baseball shortstops
Morrisania Unions players
Cleveland Forest Citys players
Brooklyn Atlantics players
Hartford Dark Blues players
Baseball players from South Carolina
19th-century baseball players
Sportspeople from Charleston, South Carolina
19th-century deaths from tuberculosis
Tuberculosis deaths in Colorado
Union Army soldiers